Edmund Leroy "Mike" Keeley (February 5, 1928 – February 23, 2022) was an American novelist, translator, and essayist, a poet, and Charles Barnwell Straut Professor of English at Princeton University. He was a noted expert on the Greek poets C. P. Cavafy, George Seferis, Odysseus Elytis, and Yannis Ritsos, and on post-Second World War Greek history.

Life and career
Keeley was born in Damascus, Syria, on February 5, 1928, the son of the American diplomat James Hugh Keeley, Jr. and Mathilde (Vossler) Keeley, a homemaker. His brother was the diplomat Robert V. Keeley. He spent his childhood in Canada, Greece, and Washington, D.C., before earning his BA from Princeton University in 1949. In 1952 he received a doctorate in Comparative Literature from Oxford University where he studied with a fellowship from the Woodrow Wilson National Fellowship Foundation.

Keeley served twice as president of the Modern Greek Studies Association from 1970 to 1973 and 1980 to 1982, and as president of PEN American Center from 1992 to 1994. He retired from a long career of teaching English, creative writing, and Hellenic studies at Princeton University in 1994.

His fiction and non-fiction are often set in Greece, where he spent part of each year, but also in Europe and the Balkans, where he has frequently traveled, and in Thailand and Washington, D.C.. He lived with his wife Mary Stathato-Kyris (married in 1951) in Princeton, New Jersey, from 1954 until her death in 2012. Keeley died from complications of a blood clot at his home in Princeton, New Jersey on February 23, 2022, at the age of 94.

Awards
1959 Rome Prize American Academy of Arts and Letters
1959 Guggenheim Fellowship
New Jersey Authors Award:
1960 For the novel The Libation (Citation)
1968 For George Seferis: Collected Poems, 1924-1955
1970 For the novel The Impostor
1962 Guinness Poetry Award selection
1972 Guggenheim Fellowship
1973 National Book Award in Translation (finalist)
1975 P.E.N.-Columbia University Translation Center Prize
1980 Harold Morton Landon Translation Award, Academy of American Poets
1982 Howard T. Behrman Award for Distinguished Achievement in the Humanities
1983 PEN/National Endowment for the Arts Fiction Syndicate Award
1984-85 Pushcart Prize Selection
1987 First European Prize for Translation of Poetry
1992 National Translation Award (Citation)
1994 Honorary Doctorate, University of Athens
1999 Academy Award in Literature
2000 PEN/Ralph Manheim Medal for Translation
2000 Criticos Prize, London Hellenic Society
2001 Commander of the Order of the Phoenix
2003 The Yale Review Prize
2003 Trustees' Annual Award, Gennadius Library
2004 Phidippides Award
2006 Honorary Doctorate, Richard Stockton College
2008 Dido Sotiriou Cultural Prize, Hellenic Authors' Society
2008 Lord Byron Award, Hellenic College
2010 Honorary Doctorate, University of Cyprus
2014 PEN Award for Poetry in Translation, for co-translator of Diaries of Exile by Yannis Ritsos

Books
 
 
 
 
 
 
 
 
 
 
 
 
 
 
 
 The Megabuilders of Queenston Park. Wild River Books. 2014. 
 Requiem for Mary. Greenhouse Review Press. 2015. 
The Problem of Time and Other Poems. Greenhouse Review Press. 2018.

Editor and translator
 Six Poets of Modern Greece (With Philip Sherrard) Alfred A. Knopf, 1961
 Vassilis Vassilikos, 'The Plant,' 'The Well,' 'The Angel': A Trilogy (With Mary Keeley) Knopf, 1964.
 Four Greek Poets (With Philip Sherrard) Penguin Books, 1965
 George Seferis, Collected Poems: 1924-1955 (With Philip Sherrard) Princeton University Press, 1967 - 
 C. P. Cavafy, Passions and Ancient Days (with George Savidis) Hogarth Press, 1972 
 Modern Greek Writers: Solomos, Calvos, Matesis, Palamas, Cavafy, Kazantzakis, Seferis, Elytis (With Peter Bien) Princeton University Press, 1972
 C. P. Cavafy, Selected Poems (With Philip Sherrard) Princeton University Press, 1972
 Odysseus Elytis, The Axion Esti (with George Savidis) Pittsburgh University Press, 1972
 C. P. Cavafy, Three Poems of Passion (with George Savidis) Plain Wrapper Press, 1975
 C. P. Cavafy, Collected Poems (With Philip Sherrard and George Savidis) Princeton University Press, 1975, revised edition, Princeton University Press, 1992. - 
 Angelos Sikelianos, Selected Poems (With Philip Sherrard) Princeton University Press, 1979
 Odysseus Elytis, Selected Poems Viking-Penguin, 1981 - 
 The Dark Crystal: An Anthology of Modern Greek Poetry (With Philip Sherrard)  Denise Harvey & CO, 1981
 Voices of Modern Greece: Selected Poems of C.P. Cavafy, Angelos Sikelianos, George Seferis, Odysseus Elytis, Nikos Gatsos (With Philip Sherrard) Princeton University Press, 1981 - 
 Yannis Ritsos, Return and Other Poems Parallel Editions, 1983
 C. P. Cavafy, A Selection of Poems (with Philip Sherrard) Camberwell Press, 1985
 Yannis Ritsos, Exile and Return: Selected Poems, 1967-74 Ecco Press, 1985
 The Legacy of R.P. Blackmur: Essays, Memoirs, Texts (with Edward T. Cone and Joseph Frank) Ecco Press, 1987 
 Yannis Ritsos: Repetitions, Testimonies, Parentheses Princeton University Press, 1991 
 The Essential Cavafy (With Philip Sherrard) Ecco Press, 1995 - 
 George Seferis, Collected Poems, (With Philip Sherrard) Princeton University Press, 1995
 George Seferis and Edmund Keeley: Correspondence, 1951-1971 Princeton University Library, 1997 
 A Century of Greek Poetry 1900-2000: Bilingual Edition (with Peter Bien, Peter Constantine, and Karen Van Dyck) Cosmos Publishing, 2004 - 
 Selected Poems Of Odysseus Elytis (with Philip Sherrard) Anvil Press, 2007 
 The Greek Poets: Homer to the Present (co-editor) W. W. Norton, 2009
 ″Angelos Sikelianos: Selected Poems″,(with Philip Sherrard), second bilingual edition, Denise Harvey (publisher), 1996,

References

External links
 Edmund Keeley Papers
 Audio: Edmund Keeley reads C. P. Cavafy's poem Ithaka
 Audio: Edmund Keeley reads a poem by Semonides of Amorgos

1928 births
2022 deaths
20th-century American male writers
20th-century American non-fiction writers
20th-century American novelists
21st-century American male writers
21st-century American non-fiction writers
21st-century American novelists
Alumni of the University of Oxford
American translators
Commanders of the Order of the Phoenix (Greece)
Corresponding Members of the Academy of Athens (modern)
Deaths from thrombosis
Greek–English translators
Novelists from New Jersey
People from Damascus
Princeton University alumni
Princeton University faculty
Fulbright alumni